Thanstein is a municipality  in the district of Schwandorf in Bavaria, Germany.

References

Schwandorf (district)